Yvette Cauquil-Prince (10 July 1928 – 1 August 2005) was a Belgian-born weaver and master craftswoman who created tapestries in direct collaboration with renowned 20th-century artists and/or their estates.  She is best known for her association with the artist Marc Chagall, which resulted in over 40 tapestries, but she also created tapestries of art works by Pablo Picasso, Max Ernst, Roberto Matta, Paul Klee, Fernand Léger, Pierre Wemaëre, Wassily Kandinsky, Brassai, Alexander Calder, Niki de Saint Phalle,  and others.

Cauquil-Prince attended the Académie Royale des Beaux-Arts (ARBA) in Belgium, but her mastery of tapestry weaving was largely self-taught, inspired by her study of Coptic textiles and tapestries from the Renaissance and Middle Ages.

She established her first studio in Paris in the late 1950s and later worked in Corsica.  In 1963 Marie Cuttoli engaged Cauquil-Prince to weave Picasso tapestries, under the condition that she would remain in the background and never meet the artist personally.  One of these tapestries, La Fermière, is now in the Picasso Museum at Antibes.

Cauquil-Prince was awarded the Chevalier of the Ordre national du Mérite in 1977 by the French government.

Collaboration with Chagall 
Cauquil-Prince was introduced to Chagall by Madeleine Malraux, wife to the French minister of Culture, André Malraux, shortly after Chagall had created tapestries for the Israeli Knesset in the mid-1960s.  Chagall and Cauquil-Prince formed a close personal as well as professional relationship which lasted until Chagall's death in 1985.

"I am like a conductor," she told an interviewer, "and Chagall is the music.  I must understand the work of Chagall so profoundly that I myself do not exist." Chagall called her "the Toscanini of tapestry," and declared that "there will never be a tapestry by Chagall without you."

In the early 1970s Chagall's wife, Vava, became jealous of her husband's special relationship with his collaborator (Chagall made it a point to tell everyone that Yvette Cauquil-Prince was his "petite fille" and spiritual daughter").  Shortly after executing commissions from the  Jewish Museum Milwaukee and the Rehabilitation Institute of Chicago for what would be the first Chagall tapestries in America, Yvette was prevented from working with Chagall for a decade. During this period she developed her association with Max Ernst.

Shortly before Chagall's death Vava relented and Cauquil-Prince resumed their collaboration.  Chagall made Cauquil-Prince promise to continue to translate his works into tapestries, which she did with Vava's blessings and later with Chagall's children and grandchildren with whom she remained very close.

Exhibitions

Solo exhibitions
1971, Galerie Verrière, Paris, France
1975, Chapelle des Cordeliers, Sarrebourg, France
1976, Exposition Marc Chagall, Hongrie et Pologne
1976, Exposition Max Ernst, Arles, France
1976, Exposition Max Ernst, USA
1976, Exposition Max Ernst, Palais des Beaux-Arts, Bruxelles, Belgique
1976, Exposition Max Ernst, Arts Center Museum, Philadelphia, PA
1976, Exposition Max Ernst, Art Center, Milwaukee, WI
1976, Exposition Max Ernst, Art Center Museum, Los Angeles, CA
1976, Galerie Dario Boccara, Paris, France
1979, Musée de Heidelberg, Allemagne
1979, Musée de Céret, Catalogne, France
1981, Centre Teschigahara, Tokyo, Japan
1983, Abbaye de l'Epau, France
1985, Musé de l'Athénée, Geneva, Switzerland
1991, Musée de Heidelberg, Germany
1992, Exposition Yvette Cauquil-Prince, Tampere, Finland
1993, Exposition Yvette Cauquil-Prince, Veruela Abbey, Spain
1993, Exposition Yvette Cauquil-Prince, Zaragoza, Spain
1994, Inauguration of Chagall tapestry La Paix, Sarrebourg, France
1996, Three Japanese Museums, Musée Mercéan à Kannùzuwa, (April 2—October 2)
1996, Exposition Yvette Cauquil-Prince (December 2—January 10, 1997), Marseille, France
1997, Exposition Yvette Cauquil-Prince (March 27—May 25), Musée de Liège, Belgium
1997, Musée du Mans, France (July 1—September 2)
1998, Heidelberg, Germany
1998, New York, NY
1998, Minsk, Belarus
2005, Musée du Pays de Sarrebourg (May 13—September 3), France

Group exhibitions

1971, Biennale de Lausanne, Switzerland
1972, Museum of Edinburgh, Scotland
1973, Palais des Beaux-Arts, Charleroi, Belgium
1975, Exposition Paul Klee, Galerie Flinker, Paris, France
1975, Biennale de Menton, France
1976, Musée des Arts Décoratifs, Paris, France
1977, Exposition Marc Chagall, Tokyo, Kyoto, Nagoya, Kumamoto, Japon
1980–1981, Musée de l'Ordre de la Libération, Paris, France
1986, Tokyo, Osaka, Yokohana, Kyoto, Japan
1992, Exposition Marc Chagall, Barcelona, Spain
1992, Exposition Marc Chagall, Mexico City, Mexico
1995, Exposition Marc Chagall, Linz, Austria
1995, Exposition Marc Chagall, Saint-Paul-de-Vence and Nice-Cimiez, France
1996, Retrospective in Japan
2000, Exposition Chagall, Johannesburg and Cape Town, South Africa
2000, Exposition Chagall, Minsk, Belarus
2004, Jewish Museum, Frankurt-am-Main (Chagall), Germany

Selected art fairs
Exhibited by the Jane Kahan Gallery:
2001–2003, Art Miami
2007, Haughton Art and Design Fair New York
2007–2008, Los Angeles Art Show
2008, Moscow World Fine Art Fair
2010, Los Angeles Art Show
2010, Haughton Art Antiques London
2010, International Fine Art and Antique Dealers Show New York
2011, Haughton Art Antiques London

References

1928 births
2005 deaths
French weavers
Women textile artists
Belgian emigrants to France